Fred Dove (September 7, 1927 – January 5, 1990) was a NASCAR Grand National driver from Martinsville, Virginia, USA.

Career
In his entire four-year career, Dove never won a race, led a lap, or started with a pole position. This driver started each race an average of 20th place and ended each race an average of 17th place. His total career earnings were $2,904 ($ when adjusted for inflation) and his best season finish was in 1953.

Dove's best finishes were at dirt tracks where he would finish an average of 15th place. His worst finishes were on road courses where his average finishers were a mediocre 48th place.

Primarily competing for himself as a driver/owner, Dove's primary vehicle would become the #71 Oldsmobile.

References

1927 births
1990 deaths
NASCAR drivers
NASCAR team owners
People from Martinsville, Virginia
Racing drivers from Virginia